The Czech National Symphony Orchestra (ČNSO or CNSO) is a Czech symphony orchestra based in Prague. The orchestra principally gives concerts at the Smetana Hall, Municipal House (Smetanova síň Obecního domu). The CNSO also performs at the Rudolfinum.

History
In 1993, trumpet player Jan Hasenöhrl and Zdeněk Košler formed the CNSO, with Košler as the orchestra's first chief conductor. Košler held the post until 1996. From 1996 to 2007, the American conductor Paul Freeman was chief conductor of the CNSO. Since 2007, Libor Pešek is the orchestra's chief conductor. He is scheduled to stand down from the post after the 2018–2019 season. In March 2019, the CNSO announced the appointment of Steven Mercurio as its next chief conductor, effective with the 2019–2020 season.

In popular music collaborations, the orchestra played on the Ulf Lundell album På andra sidan drömmarna in 1996. Lotta Engberg recorded Nära livets mening together with the orchestra in 2003, and the song was included on the 2005 album Kvinna & man. On 20 August 2003, in a Symphonic Game Music Concert in Leipzig, Germany, the orchestra became the first ensemble to perform music written for video games live outside Japan.

The CNSO has collaborated with Ennio Morricone on several projects, including the soundtrack to Giuseppe Tornatore's The Best Offer (2003). In 2015, the CNSO toured with the composer during his 60th anniversary tour. In July 2015, Morricone conducted the orchestra for recording sessions of his film score to Quentin Tarantino's The Hateful Eight.

Chief conductors
 Zdeněk Košler (1993–1996)
 Paul Freeman (1996–2007)
 Libor Pešek (2007–2019)
 Steven Mercurio (2019–present)

References

External links
  
 Czech National Symphony Orchestra
 CNSO studios

1993 establishments in the Czech Republic
Musical groups established in 1993
Czech orchestras
National orchestras
Music in Prague
Organizations based in Prague
Cedille Records artists